The Christopher Newport Captains football team represents Christopher Newport University in the NCAA Division III, competing as football-only members of the New Jersey Athletic Conference (NJAC). Christopher Newport (CNU) plays its home games at the 4,200 seat TowneBank Stadium, which is located on-campus in Newport News, Virginia. Founded in 2001, the Captains were led by head coach Matt Kelchner until 2016. Coach Art Link, only the second head coach in CNU football history took the helm starting with the 2017 football season. After 11 seasons with the USA South Athletic Conference, the Captains shifted to the NJAC to start the 2015 season.

History
By the late 1990s, the prospect of bringing football to Christopher Newport was gaining momentum from both students and the administration alike. On December 16, 1999, the CNU Board of Visitors voted in favor of starting a football program to compete at the Division III level by the 2001 season. By Spring 2000, the initial schedule was released for play in the Dixie Conference in 2001, and on May 9, 2000, Matt Kelchner was announced as the program's first head coach. In the Captains history, the program has captured seven co-conference and three outright conference championship in addition to making ten appearances in the Division III playoffs.

Seasons

See also
Christopher Newport Captains

References

 
American football teams established in 2001
2001 establishments in Virginia